Mishkino (Mişkä; , Miškan) is a rural locality (a selo) and the administrative center of Mishkinsky District in the Republic of Bashkortostan, Russia. Population:

References

Notes

Sources

Rural localities in Mishkinsky District